The Supply Act (No. 1) 2016‑2017 is an Act of the Parliament of Australia that appropriates money out of the Consolidated Revenue Fund for the ordinary annual services of the Government.

References

2016 in Australian law
Acts of the Parliament of Australia